The Ferndix Building is a historic site at 401 Fern Street in West Palm Beach, Florida, United States. It has been on the National Register of Historic Places since July 1999.

References

External links

 Palm Beach County listings at National Register of Historic Places
 Ferndix Building at Florida's Office of Cultural and Historical Programs

National Register of Historic Places in Palm Beach County, Florida